The 2008–09 season saw Amiens SC's compete in Ligue 2 where they finished in 18th position with 43 points and were relegated to the Championnat National.

Final league table

Results

Legend

Ligue 2

Coupe de France

Coupe de la Ligue

Squad statistics

References
 Player, results and statistics sourced from  ligue1.com

Amiens SC seasons
Amiens